The Chang'an Grand Theater , located on East Chang'an Avenue, is a theatre in Beijing that specializes in Peking Opera performances. Opened in 1996, the Chang'an Grand Theater is a modern Peking Opera theatre which displays modern facilities such as advanced highlights, multi-functional stage and computer-controlled sound and light systems.  In its interior, it features a Ming Dynasty design and traditional Peking Opera theatre decorations. It is one of Beijing's most popular Peking Opera theatres, and because of its modern design, it is regarded as one of the best Peking Opera theatres for acoustics.  Unlike many other opera theatres, it features English subtitles above the stage.  The theatre's second floor also contains a museum which exhibits Peking Opera costumes, make-up and artifacts.

Notes and references

External links
Chang'an Grand Theatre

Theatres in Beijing
Peking opera
Chinese opera theatres